Sing, Sing, Sing is an Australian music television series that aired from 1962 to 1965 on what would eventually become the Seven Network. Initially hosted by Lionel Long, most of the episodes were hosted by rock-and-roll singer Johnny O'Keefe. The series was produced in Sydney.

References

External links
Sing, Sing, Sing on IMDb

1962 Australian television series debuts
1965 Australian television series endings
Black-and-white Australian television shows
English-language television shows
Australian music television series
Pop music television series
Seven Network original programming